Jacek Pastusiński (born 8 September 1964 in Majdan Królewski, Podkarpackie) is a retired male triple jumper from Poland.

Achievements

References

sports-reference

1964 births
Living people
Polish male triple jumpers
Athletes (track and field) at the 1988 Summer Olympics
Olympic athletes of Poland
People from Kolbuszowa
Sportspeople from Podkarpackie Voivodeship